Warren D. Maxwell (born 15 December 1952) is a British retired competitive ice dancer. His partner was Janet Thompson. They are the 1977 World silver medalists. They represented Great Britain at the 1976 Winter Olympics, where they placed 8th.

Competitive highlights

References

Sports-reference profile

1952 births
British male ice dancers
Figure skaters at the 1976 Winter Olympics
Olympic figure skaters of Great Britain
Living people
World Figure Skating Championships medalists